Buhl High School is a high school in Buhl, Idaho. Buhl High School's mascot is an Indian. The colors are orange and black.

References

Public high schools in Idaho
Schools in Twin Falls County, Idaho